Andy De Smet (born 4 March 1970) is a Belgian former professional road cyclist.

Major results

1993
 1st Vlaamse Pijl
1995
 1st Zellik–Galmaarden
 2nd Omloop Het Nieuwsblad Beloften
1996
 1st Stadsprijs Geraardsbergen
 3rd Grote 1-MeiPrijs
 9th GP Stad Zottegem
1997
 5th Schaal Sels
 5th Brussels–Ingooigem
 5th Nokere Koerse
1998
 1st Stages 1a & 7 Herald Sun Tour
 6th Grote Prijs Jef Scherens
 6th GP Stad Zottegem
 7th Omloop van de Vlaamse Scheldeboorden
1999
 1st Omloop van de Gouden Garnaal
 7th Nokere Koerse
2000
 1st  Overall Ster ZLM Toer
 1st Ronde van Drenthe
 2nd Ronde van Noord-Holland
 2nd Grote Prijs Jef Scherens
 3rd Overall Herald Sun Tour
 3rd Leeuwse Pijl
 5th Omloop van het Waasland
 6th GP Stad Zottegem
 9th Schaal Sels
2001
 1st Stage 4 Tour of Rhodes
2002
 2nd Ronde van Drenthe
 5th Vlaamse Havenpijl
2003
 5th Omloop van het Waasland
 7th Memorial Rik Van Steenbergen
 9th Brussels–Ingooigem
 9th GP S.A.T.S.
 10th GP Rudy Dhaenens
2004
 7th Kampioenschap van Vlaanderen
2005
 2nd Kampioenschap van Vlaanderen
 2nd Ronde van Noord-Holland

References

External links

1970 births
Living people
Belgian male cyclists
People from Waregem
Cyclists from West Flanders